Treen Cove is a tidal beach on the north coast of the Penwith peninsula, Cornwall, England, UK. It is about half a mile northwest of the hamlet of Treen, and nestles between Lean Point to the east and Gurnard's Head to the west. The name of this cove is from the  Cornish 'tre' (farm, settlement) and 'din' (fort), referring to the adjacent Iron Age promontory fort at Gurnard's Head.

Francis Kilvert reported that on 29 July 1870 in Treen Cove ″Fishing boats lay up in this cove, sheltered from the stormy sea by a large guardian-rock.″

References

Beaches of Penwith
Coves of Cornwall
Zennor